Marcellus High School is a public high school in Onondaga County, New York, United States.  It is located in Marcellus, New York on the same campus as Marcellus Central School District's Middle and Elementary Schools.  Approximately 700 students attend the high school with over 65 teachers and staff members.

Student activities
All School Show (Musical)
Fall Show (Play)
Chess Club
Class Government/Student Council
Character Education Committee
National Honor Society
French Honor Society
Mock Trial
Teen Institute
Yearbook
Intramural Sports
SADD (Students Against Destructive Decisions)
Ski Club-President: Barrie Lucas Potter
Science Olympiad
Math League
Book Club
Lit Mag
Outdoor Club
Concert and Symphonic Band
Concert and Select Choir
Tap Dancing Club
Esports Club

Athletics

Fall
Football
Boys Soccer
Girls Soccer
Boys Cross Country
Girls Cross Country
Girls Tennis
Women's Volleyball

Winter
Wrestling
Boys Basketball
Girls Basketball
Volleyball
Indoor Track

Spring
Boys Tennis
Boys Lacrosse
Girls Lacrosse
Baseball
Softball
Boys Track & Field
Girls Track & Field
Boys Golf
Girls Golf

Courses
There are many courses offered at the high school with the option of doing other programs off-site.  Some courses are offered through colleges/universities for dual credit.  Some Advanced Placement (AP) courses are offered.  Language courses include Spanish and French.

References

External links
Marcellus Schools

Public high schools in New York (state)
Schools in Onondaga County, New York